The Socialist Party is a social-democratic political party in Bosnia and Herzegovina.

Formed on 2 June 1993 in Banja Luka, it served as one of the first democratic alternatives to nationalist government of Republika Srpska. After the signing of the Dayton Accord, the party became a vocal opponent of the government of Radovan Karadžić and the Serb Democratic Party.

Its subsequent coalitions with the increasingly-nationalist Alliance of Independent Social Democrats and Democratic People's Alliance have, however, diminished its standing as a leftist and multi-ethnic party.

It only contests elections in Republika Srpska and the Brčko District, currently serving in the governing majority in the former. SP secured its second-ever seat in the House of Representatives at the 2018 general election.

National Assembly of RS elections

Positions held
Major positions held by Socialist Party members:

References

1993 establishments in Bosnia and Herzegovina
Political parties established in 1993
Political parties in Republika Srpska
Serb political parties in Bosnia and Herzegovina
Social democratic parties in Bosnia and Herzegovina
Socialist Party of Serbia
Eurosceptic parties in Bosnia and Herzegovina